The Thailand Hockey Association is the governing body of field hockey in Thailand. It is affiliated to IHF International Hockey Federation and AHF Asian Hockey Federation. The headquarters of the federation are in Bangkok.

Chaiyapak Siriwat is the President of the Thailand Hockey Association and Chanchaiyos Audsuwe is the Secretary.

See also
 Thailand men's national field hockey team
 Thailand women's national field hockey team

References

External links
 Thailand Hockey Association

Thailand
Hockey
Field hockey in Thailand